Lynn Johnston (born 1947), is a Canadian cartoonist.

Lynn Johnston may refer to:

Lynn Johnston (makeup artist)
Lyn Johnston, voice actor on The Super 6

See also
Lynn Johnson (disambiguation)
Linda Johnston, American author